Gadime e Epërme (is a village in Lipjan municipality.

Notes

References 

Villages in Lipljan